De Vlugt is a town in George Local Municipality in the Western Cape province of South Africa.

De Vlugt is situated on the banks of the Keurbooms River, approximately 55 km north of Knysna. It originated as a construction camp for the 270 convicts who built the Prince Alfred Pass in 1861. Later a small community emerged around the camp.

References

Populated places in the George Local Municipality